James Spotila is an American biologist, focusing on biology of sea turtles, crocodiles, salamanders and giant pandas and physiological ecology, biophysical ecology and conservation biology, currently the L. Drew Betz Chair at Drexel University and an Elected Fellow of the American Association for the Advancement of Science.

References

Fellows of the American Association for the Advancement of Science
Drexel University faculty
21st-century American biologists
University of Dayton alumni
University of Arkansas alumni
Living people
Year of birth missing (living people)